EasyOffice was an office suite for Microsoft Windows developed by E-Press corporation that came in two versions:
 EasyOffice Freeware, free for non-commercial personal use. It was featured in Maximum PC magazine as the second best alternative for Microsoft Office in 2004.
 EasyOffice Premium, consists of EasyOffice Freeware plus a PDF Filter and EasyAntiVirus, an antivirus program

EasyOffice was replaced with another suite, also now defunct, simply called ONE (also released in a scaled down form as ONE SE). The company's former website (www.e-press.com) is now a parked domain.

Included applications
 EasyWord with PDF Filter (DOC, RTF, HTML, and PDF files)
 EasyMail integrated with CRM, EasySchedule, EasyCRM, high-speed Anti-Spam
 EasySpreadsheet (XLS files); EasyPresentation (PowerPoint-like presentations)
 EasyDictionary (full-reference dictionary)
 EasyBookKeeper (accounting)
 EasyPad (Notepad replacement)
 Easy Contact Manager (hot lists, mass e-mails, form letters)
 EasySpeaker (reads docs and e-mails out loud)
 EasyZip (full-fledged zipping/unzipping program)
 EasyHelper
 EasyImage
 EasyDatabase
 EasyCalculator
 EasyCalendar
 EasyBackup

See also
List of office suites
Comparison of office suites

References

External links
 About.com review
  PC Magazine review from 2004

Office suites
Freeware